is a Japanese badminton player from the Yonex team. In 2017, she became the women's doubles runner-up at the Osaka International tournament partnered with Ayako Sakuramoto. She won her first senior international title at the Spanish International tournament with Sakuramoto.

Takahata started to represent the national team in the 2015 World Junior Championships held in Lima, Peru, and helped the team reach the semifinals. At the BWF Grand Prix events, her best result was a runner-up at the 2017 New Zealand Open.

Teamed-up with Sakuramoto, Takahata won seven of eight finals of the 2018 BWF World Tour, with a title of Super 500 tournament from Singapore Open, three titles of Super 300 tournament from Swiss, New Zealand, and Australia Open; and three titles of Super 100 tournament. She participated at the 2019 Asia Mixed Team Championships, and won the silver medal after the team lost to the Chinese in the final.

Achievements

BWF World Tour (8 titles, 1 runners-up) 
The BWF World Tour, which was announced on 19 March 2017 and implemented in 2018, is a series of elite badminton tournaments sanctioned by the Badminton World Federation (BWF). The BWF World Tours are divided into levels of World Tour Finals, Super 1000, Super 750, Super 500, Super 300 (part of the HSBC World Tour), and the BWF Tour Super 100.

Women's doubles

BWF Grand Prix 
The BWF Grand Prix had two levels, the Grand Prix and Grand Prix Gold. It was a series of badminton tournaments sanctioned by the Badminton World Federation (BWF) and played between 2007 and 2017.

Women's doubles

  BWF Grand Prix Gold tournament
  BWF Grand Prix tournament

BWF International Challenge/Series 
Women's doubles

  BWF International Challenge tournament
  BWF International Series tournament

References

External links 

 

1998 births
Living people
Sportspeople from Hokkaido
Japanese female badminton players